Anatoliy Yarosh (born 25 October 1952) is a Ukrainian athlete. He competed in the men's shot put at the 1980 Summer Olympics, representing the Soviet Union.

References

1952 births
Living people
Athletes (track and field) at the 1980 Summer Olympics
Ukrainian male shot putters
Soviet male shot putters
Olympic athletes of the Soviet Union
Place of birth missing (living people)
Universiade silver medalists for the Soviet Union
Universiade medalists in athletics (track and field)
Medalists at the 1975 Summer Universiade